Uganda is an overwhelmingly Christian majority country, with Islam being the second most widely professed faith. According to the 2013 National Census, Islam in Uganda was practised by 13.7 percent of the population. The Pew Research Center in 2014, however, estimated that 11.5 percent of Ugandans were Muslim, compared to 35.2 percent of Tanzanians, 9.7 percent of Kenyans, 6.2 percent of South Sudanese, 2.8 percent of Burundians, and 1.8 percent of Rwandans. The vast majority of Muslims in Uganda are Sunni. Small Shia and Ahmadi minorities are also present.

The Iganga District in the east of Uganda had the highest percentage of Muslims according to a 2009 published report.

19th century
Islam had arrived in Uganda from the north and through inland networks of the East African coastal trade by the mid-nineteenth century. Some Baganda Muslims trace their family's conversion to the period in which Kabaka Mutesa I converted to Islam in the nineteenth century. Islam entered Uganda through the Buganda route in the 1840s and the northern Uganda route through the Turko-Egyptian influences. Kasozi, (1986: 23) gives 1844 as the year when the first Muslim Arab trader, Ahmed bin Ibrahim, reached the King's court in Buganda.

2002 census

The 2002 national census recorded that Muslims represented 12.1 percent of the population.

Geographical distribution 
Yumbe District is the only district with a Muslim-majority (76%). Muslims form a significant minority in the districts of Mayuge (36%) and Iganga (34%).

See also
 Islam by country

References

Further reading

External links

 Muslim population estimates on islamicweb.com
 Muslim population estimates on Islamicpopulation.com